Norman Orentreich (December 26, 1922 – January 23, 2019) was a New York dermatologist and the father of modern hair transplantation.

Orentreich created Estee Lauder Companies' Clinique line of skin care products, invented a number of dermatologic procedures and was the first president of the American Society for Dermatologic Surgery.  He is the founder of the Orentreich Medical Group and the Orentreich Foundation for the Advancement of Science, and the co-director of the latter organization.

Hair transplantation
The New York Academy of Medicine cited Orentreich's early research, as a young man, as being critical to later developments in hair transplantation: While at NYU’s Skin and Cancer hospital, Norman focused his clinical research on patients with hair loss, making use of small scalp skin grafts to better understand the pathophysiology of these diverse conditions. This led to the establishment of the theory of donor and recipient dominance, making it surgically possible to transplant healthy “androgen insensitive” hair from the back of the scalp to the “androgen sensitive” bald areas in the front where it would take and grow permanently.

In 1952, Orentreich, having graduated from New York University School of Medicine in 1948, performed the first modern, and successful, hair transplants in his office in New York. By 1961, Orentreich had performed transplants on approximately 200 patients.  By 1966, approximately 10,000 men over the world had undergone the treatment invented by Orentreich.
According to the textbook Hair Transplantation, edited by Walter P. Unger, M.D. and Ronald Shapiro, M.D.: As at one time all roads led to Rome, no discussion of the origins of hair transplantation, as a treatment for MPB (Male Pattern Baldness) or of any of the men who first practiced this technique can begin without homage to this extraordinary clinician and scientist who gladly -- and from the beginning -- shared his knowledge with colleagues all over the world... The true "fathers" of hair restoration for MPB (male pattern baldness) all emerged as a result of collaboration or friendship with Dr. Orentreich.
In the process of performing hair transplants, Orentreich discovered that "hair maintained the characteristics of the area from which it comes (the hair-bearing donor area), rather than to the area in which it is transplanted (the bald recipient area)," he coined this principle donor dominance.

Clinique
In 1968, Orentreich cowrote an article in Vogue with Carol Philips titled Can Great Skin Be Created? In August of that year, Clinique was launched. Clinique's promotional materials highlight Orentreich's influence on the brand's ethos:

Dr Norman Orentreich holds that human skin is intuitively capable of renewing itself, although this capability weakens with the passage of age and environmental conditions. He believes that great skin can be created if the secrets of the natural skin development are unlocked.

This is reflected in the success of Clinique's custom-fit 3-Step Skin Care System, which entails taking three minutes of your time, twice a day, to cleanse with Facial Soap, exfoliate with Clarifying Lotion and moisturise with Dramatically Different Moisturising Lotion. All three steps are intricately linked to promote the self-renewing capability of your skin and to make your skin radiate at all times as it should be.

Today, Clinique is the crown jewel of the Estee Lauder brand.  The New York Times reported in March 2011, "Last year, Clinique was the best-selling skin-care brand in United States department stores, according to the NPD Group, a market research firm that tracks such sales; the Estée Lauder brand came in second."

Two of Orentreich's children, Dr. David Orentreich and Dr. Catherine Orentreich, work with Clinique as the brand's "Guiding Dermatologists".

The Orentreich Foundation for the Advancement of Science
In 1961, Orentreich founded the Orentreich Foundation for the Advancement of Science (OFAS), a biomedical research organization.  OFAS has done work on aging, cancer and dermatology.

Beginning in 1964, a group of members of the Kaiser Permanente integrated care delivery system in the northern California region participated in a program conducted by Kaiser Permanente that involved broad-spectrum physical examinations, including blood testing. Kaiser Permanente continued to maintain a portion of the blood serum specimens for use in future health research. Starting in 1980 and continuing until 2012, OFAS contributed the resources and services that were required to retain and maintain the KP-OFAS Serum Repository. In particular, OFAS validated the chemical integrity of the retained serum and catalogued the specimens and their coded data in a computer database so they could be retrieved efficiently and used productively in health research studies.

In celebration of the bicentennial of the United States, the Orentreich foundation was called upon to study hairs belonging to President George Washington to determine the blood type of America's first president.  After seeking out the assistance and expertise of Dr. M. Mitsuo Yokoyama it was determined that Washington had B type blood.

External links
 - The Orentreich Medical Group
 - The Orentreich Foundation for the Advancement of Science

References

1922 births
2019 deaths
American dermatologists
Hair transplantation
New York University Grossman School of Medicine alumni
20th-century American Jews
Jewish physicians
21st-century American Jews